Bonita Springs is a city in Lee County, Florida, United States. The population was 53,644 at the 2020 census. It is part of the Cape Coral-Fort Myers, Florida Metropolitan Statistical Area, on the state's southwest coast.

Geography

The city is located on both Estero Bay and the Gulf of Mexico.  The area referred to as Bonita Beach is located on a road-accessible barrier island (Little Hickory Island) that lies between the Gulf of Mexico and Estero Bay.  The Imperial River flows through the downtown district of the city and empties out into Estero Bay.

Climate
Hurricane Charley made landfall north of Bonita Springs on August 13, 2004. Hurricane Wilma made landfall south of Bonita Springs on October 24, 2005. On September 9–10, 2017, Hurricane Irma, at the time a slow-moving Category 3 storm, passed over the southwest coast of Florida. The eyewall/eye passed overhead in Bonita Springs. Many structures were damaged or destroyed and the city experienced significant flooding.

Demographics

As of the census of 2010, there were 43,914 people living in the city. Household data and density data have not yet been released, but as of the 2009 census estimate, there are 19,233 households, and 12,974 families living in the city. The population density in 2000 was 929.4 inhabitants per square mile (358.8/km). The 2010 racial makeup of the city was 88.8% White, 0.8% African American, 0.5% Native American, 1% Asian, 0.1% Pacific Islander, 7.3% from other races, and 1.4% from two or more races. Hispanic or Latino of any race were 22.5% of the population.

There were 19,233 households in 2009 out of which 16.7% had children under the age of 18 living with them, 61.2% were married couples living together, 4.1% had a female householder with no husband present, and 32.5% were non-families. 27.1% of all households were made up of individuals, and 11.6% had someone living alone who was 65 years of age or older. The average household size was 2.15 and the average family size was 2.55.

In 2000, the city the population was spread out, with 13.9% under the age of 18, 5.9% from 18 to 24, 19.8% from 25 to 44, 28.8% from 45 to 64, and 31.7% who were 65 years of age or older. The median age was 54 years. For every 100 females, there were 104.6 males. For every 100 females aged 18 and over, there were 103.9 males.

The 2009 estimated median income for a household in the city was $53,452, and the median income for a family was $53,436. Males had a median income of $31,227 versus $25,358 for females. The per capita income for the city was $37,958. About 6.2% of families and 10% of the population were below the poverty line, including 20.2% of those under age 18 and 5.2% of those aged 65 or over.

Points of interest 

 Barefoot Beach Preserve Park, a  park located on the border of Collier and Lee Counties. In 2013, Forbes ranked the park's beach the sixth-best in the country
 Bonita Beach Park, a  beachfront park with a boardwalk and swimming area
 Center for the Arts of Bonita Springs - an arts organization that hosts local, regional and national traveling art exhibitions. The organization has two campuses, the 10-acre Center for Visual Arts with galleries, studios, classrooms, art library, and offices; and 1. 8 miles south, the 4-acre Center for Performing Arts, which has two auditoriums, a black box theater, a film center, music rooms and studios for study of performing arts. The organization's Bonita Springs Art Festivals, are held January, February, and March in downtown Bonita Springs
 Corkscrew Swamp Sanctuary, a bald cypress reserve under management of the National Audubon Society
 Bonita Spring's Wonder Gardens, features a large collection of Florida wildlife, including exotic birds, alligators, and flamingos. The facility opened in 1936 as both a wildlife exhibition and a refuge for injured animals and has a botanical garden and a natural history museum
 Little Hickory Island Beach Park
 Lover's Key State Park, a  park made up of four barrier islands, is within the city and just north of Bonita Beach. It has nature trails for hiking and bicycling, a canoe launch, kayak and canoe rentals, acres of unspoiled mangroves and miles of pristine beaches. A haven for wildlife, the islands and their waters are home to West Indian manatees, bottlenose dolphins, roseate spoonbills, marsh rabbits and bald eagles
 There are also 10 beach accesses with public parking up and down Bonita Beach

Education
Bonita Springs is served by the Lee County School District.

Transportation

Airports
 Southwest Florida International Airport in nearby South Fort Myers serves over 8 million passengers annually.
 Naples Municipal Airport in Naples is a smaller airport primarily for private aviation

Major highways
  Interstate 75
  U.S. Route 41 "South Tamiami Trail"
  (County Road 865) Bonita Beach Road / Hickory Boulevard

Mass transportation
Fixed-route bus and trolley service is provided by the Lee County Transit Department, operated as LeeTran.

Rail
Seminole Gulf Railway owns and operates a line that passes through the city.  The company offers freight service and local, daytime excursions.

Media

Newspapers
Bonita Springs is served by local editions of the Fort Myers News-Press and Naples Daily News.

Radio
The metropolitan area is home to 36 radio stations. With an Arbitron-assigned 879,600 listening area population, the metropolitan area of which Bonita Springs is one part ranks 61/274 for the fall of 2013. Arbitron Standard Radio Market: Ft. Myers-Naples-Marco Island.

Television
Nielsen Media Research designated market area: Ft. Myers-Naples.

2013 - 2014 estimate U.S. rank: 62/210 (517,920 TV Homes)

 WBBH – NBC affiliate
 WFTX – Fox affiliate
 WGCU – PBS member station
 WINK – CBS affiliate
 WXCW – CW affiliate
 WZVN – ABC affiliate
 BTV 98 – Government-access television operated by the city of Bonita Springs

Sister cities
 Gruenstadt, Germany
 Isla Mujeres, Quintana Roo, Mexico

Notable people

 Glenn Steil Sr., member of the Michigan Senate

References

External links

 
Cities in Lee County, Florida
Populated coastal places in Florida on the Gulf of Mexico
Cities in Florida
Former census-designated places in Florida
Beaches of Lee County, Florida
Beaches of Florida
1999 establishments in Florida
Populated places established in 1999